This is a list of shopping malls located in Abu Dhabi, United Arab Emirates. 

Tourist attractions in Abu Dhabi
Shopping malls in Abu Dhabi
Abu Dhabi